Pitcairnia matudae is a plant species in the genus Pitcairnia. The species is endemic to Mexico.

References

matudae
Flora of Mexico